Henry Eliot Howard  (13 November 1873 – 26 December 1940) was an English amateur ornithologist, noted for being one of the first to describe territoriality behaviours in birds in a detailed manner. His ideas on territoriality were influential in the work of Max Nicholson.

Biography 
Henry Eliot Howard was born at Stone House, at Stone, near Kidderminster, second son of Henry Howard and Alice Gertrude Thomson. He studied at Stoke Poges, Eton, and Mason College (the forerunner of the University of Birmingham). He entered his father's steelworks firm, Lloyd and Lloyd in Worcester, becoming a director in 1896. Then in 1903 a director of the enlarged firm, Stewarts & Lloyds.

He showed from his earliest childhood an intense love of natural history. It was not until 1914 that his first work, British Warblers, illustrated by Henrik Grönvold, was fully published, having been issued in parts since 1907. Continually working on the theory of territory, he published Territory in Bird Life, illustrated by George Edward Lodge and Henrik Grönvold, in 1920 (a reissue in 1948 had an introduction by Julian Huxley and James Fisher), followed by An Introduction to the Study of Bird Behaviour, Nature of a Bird's World and lastly A Waterhen's Worlds, in 1940. His books were published under the name "Eliot Howard".

He was a Justice of the Peace and for forty-five years a member of the British Ornithologists' Union, including a period as a vice-president.

His home was always in Worcestershire. In 1900 he still gave his address as Stone House, but once married he and his wife lived at 'Clareland', Hartlebury, which overlooked the River Severn, and in whose grounds he conducted much of his ornithological research Nonetheless, much of his time was spent on the wild coast of Donegal and in the north west of Ireland, shooting, fishing and studying natural history. He was attracted to the wild and beautiful area of Horn Head in the North West of Donegal, close to the Atlantic Ocean, through his marriage in 1900 to Anne Elizabeth Frances Stewart  (1875–1960) whose family had lived there for many years (the 1901 census of Ireland shows his wife was born in Donegal). He died of meningitis at Clareland on 26 December 1940 and was buried at St Mary's Church, Bishops Green, Stourport, on 30 December. An obituary was published in The Times on 28 December.

His papers are in the Alexander Library, at the University of Oxford.

His father, Henry was a manufacturing chemist and was son of John Eliot Howard. John's father was Luke Howard. The 1901 Census shows Henry Eliot as an 'Iron tube manufacturer'.

The Howards had two sons and four daughters. One daughter, Esme Eleanor Howard, married the Reverend John William Fletcher Boughey, son of the Reverend Percy Fletcher Boughey and Elsie de Strange Herring, on 25 April 1940.

Bibliography

Books 

 2 vols.

Journal articles 
 
 
 
 
 
 
 1902a: 'On Mr. Selous' Theory of the Origin of Nests'. The Zoologist, 4th series, vol. 6, p. 145–148.
 1902b: 'Cirl Bunting in Ireland'. The Zoologist, 4th series, vol. 6, (section 'Notes and Queries'), p. 353/4
 1902c: 'The Birds of Sark; and Variation in Song'. The Zoologist, 4th series, vol. 6, p. 416–422.

Notes

References

Sources 
 
  (Also available via BHL.)

External links

 
 
 The diary of Henry Howard of Stone House – Kidderminster

1873 births
1940 deaths
English ornithologists
People educated at Eton College
People from Kidderminster
Alumni of the University of Birmingham
English nature writers
People from Stourport-on-Severn